Carl Anders Theodor Starfelt (born 1 June 1995) is a Swedish professional footballer who plays as a centre-back for Scottish Premiership club Celtic and the Sweden national football team.

Club career

IF Brommapojkarna 
Starfelt started off his career at Brommapojkarna and made his debut in Allsvenskan against Kalmar FF on 30 March 2014.

IFK Göteborg 
He joined IFK Göteborg ahead of the 2018 Allsvenskan season.

Rubin Kazan 
On 13 July 2019, he signed a four-year contract with Russian Premier League club FC Rubin Kazan.

Celtic 
On 21 July 2021, Starfelt agreed on a four-year contract with Scottish Premiership side Celtic. He would be involved in a center-back partnership with fellow summer signing Cameron Carter-Vickers which helped Celtic win the 2021–22 Scottish Premiership title, as they finished with the best defensive record in the league that season.

On 2 December 2021, Starfelt was given his first ever man of the match award for his performance in a 1–0 home win against Heart of Midlothian in the Scottish Premiership.

On 19 December 2021, Starfelt started for Celtic against Hibernian in the 2021–22 Scottish League Cup final. Celtic won 2–1, thanks to a brace from Kyogo Furuhashi and Starfelt collected his first career honour.

On 18 April 2022, Starfelt scored an own goal against Rangers in extra time to give the latter a 2–1 win over Celtic, subsequently allowing Rangers to go on and win the Scottish Cup Final against Hearts. 

On 14 August 2022, Starfelt scored his first goal for Celtic in a 5–0 win at Kilmarnock in the Scottish Premiership. His second goal for the club followed in a 9–0 win at Dundee United on 28 August 2022.

On 2 November 2022, Starfelt made his UEFA Champions League debut against Real Madrid in a 5–1 defeat for Celtic at the Santiago Bernabéu.

International career
After having made two appearances for the Sweden U19 team in 2014, Starfelt was called up to the Sweden national team for the first time on 30 September 2020 ahead of their games against Russia, Croatia, and Portugal in October 2020. He made his full international debut on 8 October 2020 in a friendly game against Russia, playing all 90 minutes alongside Sebastian Holmén at centre-back in a 2–1 win for Sweden.

Career statistics

Club

International

Honours
Celtic
Scottish Premiership: 2021–22
Scottish League Cup: 2021–22 2022–23

References

External links

1995 births
Living people
Footballers from Stockholm
Swedish footballers
Association football defenders
Sweden international footballers
Sweden youth international footballers
Allsvenskan players
Russian Premier League players
Scottish Professional Football League players
IF Brommapojkarna players
IFK Göteborg players
FC Rubin Kazan players
Celtic F.C. players
Swedish expatriate footballers
Swedish expatriate sportspeople in Russia
Expatriate footballers in Russia
Swedish expatriate sportspeople in Scotland
Expatriate footballers in Scotland